Sumner is an unincorporated community in Coos County, Oregon, United States.

According to William Gladstone Steel, the community was founded in 1888 by John B. Dulley (other sources have the spelling as "Dulley"), who named it after Charles Sumner, a Massachusetts senator who died in 1874. Sumner post office, however, was established in 1874, so Steel must have had the date wrong. Dulley was the first postmaster, and the office closed in 1961. In 1915, Sumner had a population of 100. As of 1990, the community had one store.

See also
Steamboats of Coos Bay

References

Unincorporated communities in Coos County, Oregon
1874 establishments in Oregon
Populated places established in 1874
Unincorporated communities in Oregon